William Paddock (January 6, 1832 – March 16, 1891) was an American businessman and politician.

Born in Montpelier, Vermont, Paddock moved to Neenah, Wisconsin in 1848. Paddock was in the harness and carriage business. Paddock then moved to Markesan, Green Lake County, Wisconsin. He served as justice of the peace. Paddock also served as postmaster for Markesan, Wisconsin. In 1881, Paddock served in the Wisconsin State Assembly and was a Republican. Paddock died in Sussex, Wisconsin, and was buried at Markesan Memorial Cemetery in Markesan.

Notes

External links

1832 births
1891 deaths
People from Montpelier, Vermont
People from Markesan, Wisconsin
Politicians from Neenah, Wisconsin
Businesspeople from Wisconsin
Republican Party members of the Wisconsin State Assembly
Wisconsin postmasters
19th-century American politicians
19th-century American businesspeople
American justices of the peace